Les Anderson may refer to:
Les Anderson (racing driver) (1910–1949), American racecar driver
Les Anderson (fisher) (died 2003), American record-holding salmon fisher
Les Anderson, the main character of the 1988 American movie License to Drive

See also
Leslie Anderson (born 1982), Cuban baseball player
Leslie Anderson (cricketer) (1891–1979), New Zealand cricketer